Orcynopsis unicolor (plain bonito) is a ray-finned, bony fish in the bonito tribe of the mackerel family (Scombridae). It occurs in the eastern Atlantic from southern Norway, where it is a vagrant, to Senegal, although it is not found in the seas around the Macaronesian Islands. It is also found in the Mediterranean Sea and extends to the Black Sea.

Also called the palomette or tasarte,  this fish is classified into the genus Orcynopsis, which is a monotypic taxon, having only this single species in its membership. It grows to four feet, and thirty pounds.

References

Scombridae
Fish described in 1817